Sweet Talk and Good Lies is the fifth album by Heather Myles. Highlights include the title song, "Sweet Talk and Good Lies, " "Nashville's Gone Hollywood,"and "Little Chapel," a duet with fellow honky-tonker Dwight Yoakam.

Track listing
"Sweet Talk and Good Lies" (Heather Myles) – 3:12
"Nashville's Gone Hollywood" (Heather Myles) – 2:57
"Never Had a Broken Heart" (Heather Myles) – 4:13
"One Man Woman Again" (Heather Myles) – 3:04
"Little Chapel" [with Dwight Yoakam] (Heather Myles) – 2:57
"By the Time I Get to Phoenix" (Jimmy Webb) – 2:48
"One and Only Lover" (Heather Myles) – 2:31
"Big Cars" (Heather Myles) – 3:30
"The Love You Left Behind" (Heather Myles) – 3:11
"If the Truth Hurts" (Heather Myles) – 2:21
"Homewrecker Blues" (Heather Myles) – 2:48
"Sweet Little Dangerous" (Heather Myles) – 3:01
"Cry Me a River" (Arthur Hamilton) – 2:57

Heather Myles albums
2002 albums